William Sheffield was an American attorney and judge in the state of California. He was a general legal counsel for the Church of Jesus Christ of Latter-day Saints (LDS Church) in the Asia Area of the church and was closely connected with the sending of Mormon missionaries to India by the church in the late-20th century. Sheffield has also served as a judge in the Superior Courts of California, Orange County.

Sheffield earned his undergraduate degree from California State University, Long Beach.  and then attended law school at the University of California, Berkeley.

From 1983 to 1985 Sheffield was a judge on the Superior Court of California, sitting in Orange County.  He also served as a member of Indira Gandhi's defense team in the late 1970s (see below).  In 1985, Sheffield resigned his judgeship and went to Yale Divinity School.  At the time Sheffield began attending services of the Methodist Church.  His wife was a Latter-day Saint.

Sheffield's investigations of Mormonism while at Yale lead him to enroll at Brigham Young University (BYU), which had created a graduate program in theology for his study. He did much of his work at BYU under Joseph Fielding McConkie and eventually joined the LDS Church, whereupon he returned to Yale where he completed his divinity degree.

In 1988 William Sheffield defended Morris Albert Kaiserman in a plagiarism lawsuit over his hit song "Feelings". [ Gaste v. Morris Kaiserman 863 F.2d 1061 (2d Cir. 1988) ]  Gaste received approximately 1/2 million dollars US for the plagiarism lawsuit over Gaste's obscure song in the 1957 French movie soundtrack of "Le feu aux poudres", https://www.imdb.com/title/tt0050390/.  The lackluster revenue of this soundtrack earned less than $15,000 in worldwide royalties https://www.amazon.com/gp/product/B000GAL3DW/ref=ppx_yo_dt_b_asin_image_o03_s00?ie=UTF8&psc=1.  This is a partial and simplified soundtrack of  “Pour Toi” https://cpb-us-w2.wpmucdn.com/blogs.law.gwu.edu/dist/a/4/files/2018/12/feelings-1711njr.mp3  In listening to the soundtrack it is clear that Morris Kaiserman used “Pour Toi” verbatum to produce much-loved "Feelings".  William Sheffield didn't prevail in his defense of Morris Albert.  Incidental to the lawsuit, Bill purchased the remaining rights to "Feelings".  This song is now an elevator music song, and when you're on hold, you can still hear this extremely popular song.  Gaste's lawyers failed to protect future ASCAP royalties and these royalties are substantial, unlike the success of Gaste's "Pour Toi".  Visit https://blogs.law.gwu.edu/mcir/case/gaste-v-morris-kaiserman/ to hear more of this saga.  While Morris took the basic melody and improved it with instrumental flourishes, it is still an example of extreme plagiarism.

In other lawsuits, Bill defended a hippopotamus that escaped from an animal safari attraction [now an outdoor amphitheater] in Irvine California.  Bill also sued the Pope over the death of a St. Bernard canine purchased from a catholic monastery in Switzerland.  It is unclear of the success of these lawsuits since the Pope and the hippopotamus are not talking.  In addition to animal rights [long before its current popularity], Bill Sheffield was a successful criminal defense attorney in Orange county CA, up until his elevation to Superior Court judge in 1983.

After completing his divinity degree from Yale, he worked as the LDS Church's legal counsel in Asia where he used his connections with Rajiv Gandhi to get LDS Church missionaries allowed into that country.

Sheffield had a major role in the development of Dr. ADSN Prasad's humanitarian Pathway Centers for Mentally and Physically Disabled Children in Chennai, India. He met Dr. Prasad in 1988 then spent decades helping Pathway develop funding and vision to grow to serve tens of thousands of the needy in India. This included establishing the US-based 501(c)(3) organization Pathway Centre for Mentally and Physically Handicapped Children.

Upon completion of his assignment for the Church in 1990, Sheffield returned to Southern California where he has been an active mediator/arbitrator, having conducted over 5000 mediations and arbitrations, now exclusively with Judicate West. Sheffield has been named among the top twenty neutrals in California by the Daily Journal. He has also been named among the top lawyers in America.

Since his retirement, Sheffield has been hired by the Los Angeles Unified School District to investigate complaints of retaliatory suspensions of students for actions by their parents in a San Fernando Valley Middle School.

Sheffield wrote the article "Voices from the Dust" in the Encyclopedia of Mormonism.

Notes

References
J. Reuben Clark Law Society, Orange County Chapter Newsletter
mention of recent activity by Judge Sheffield
Gordon B. Hinckley, "The Question of a Mission", Ensign, May 1986, p. 40.
Jan Pinborough, "Sowing Seeds, Sharing Blessings", Ensign, October 2004, p. 54
article that incorrectly state's Sheffield was a supreme court justice
website of Pathway, the organization connected with the orphanage in India Sheffield has helped

External links
Judicate west listing

Living people
California State University, Long Beach alumni
Yale Divinity School alumni
Brigham Young University alumni
Converts to Mormonism from Methodism
University of California, Berkeley alumni
American Latter Day Saints
The Church of Jesus Christ of Latter-day Saints in Asia
California state court judges
Year of birth missing (living people)